Below is a list of newspapers published in Bhutan.

 Bhutan Observer —  English and Dzongkha; formerly bi-weekly, now only online
 The Bhutan Times —  English; weekly
 Bhutan Today — English; bi-weekly
 Bhutan Youth — English 
 The Bhutanese —  English and Dzongkha; weekly 
 Business Bhutan — English and Dzongkha; weekly
 Druk Neytshul — Dzongkha  
 Druk Yoedzer — Dzongkha
 Gyalchi Sarshog — Dzongkha    
 The Journalist — English and Dzongkha; weekly
 Kuensel — English and Dzongkha; daily

External sites with news about Bhutan
 Bhutan News Service - English and Nepali; located outside Bhutan

See also
Media of Bhutan

External links
 Newspapers List of Bhutan
 Bhutan InfoCom and Media Authority

References



Bhutan
 
Newspapers